Clubs Are Trump is a 1917 American short comedy film featuring Harold Lloyd.

Plot
Harold Lloyd and Snub Pollard are "two famous lascars" who annoy several wooing couples in a public park.  Eventually their antics enrage a large suitor who violently tosses them into a shallow lake.  Lloyd and Pollard emerge from the lake and fall asleep on a park bench where they simultaneously dream of living in caveman times.

While there, they try to woo a royal harem and run afoul of the caveman king and his club-swinging minions.  Lloyd and Pollard divert their pursuers into a pond where a crocodile resides and have the harem to themselves.  As they embrace the females, they both wake up on the park bench embracing each other.  A park policeman breaks up their embrace.  Lloyd and Snub eventually trap the policemen in the crook of a low tree, but are soon on the run from dozens more officers of the law.

Cast
 Harold Lloyd as The Boy
 Snub Pollard 
 Bebe Daniels 
 Gilbert Pratt
 Fred C. Newmeyer
 Billy Fay
 Bud Jamison
 Charles Stevenson (as Charles E. Stevenson)
 Sammy Brooks
 David Voorhees
 Virginia Baynes
 Ruth Rowan
 Grace McLernon
 Ruth Churchill

See also
 List of American films of 1917
 Harold Lloyd filmography

References

External links

1917 films
Silent American comedy films
American silent short films
American black-and-white films
1917 comedy films
1917 short films
Films directed by Hal Roach
Lonesome Luke films
American comedy short films
Films about cavemen
Films about dreams
1910s American films